Sandy Wollschlager (born December 19, 1957) was an American chemist and politician.

Wollschlager was born in Austin, Mower County, Minnesota and graduated from Austin High School. She received her associate degree from Albert Lea Technical College (now Riverland Community College). Wollschlager received her bachelor's degree in chemistry from Augsburg University and her master's degree in public administration, science, technology, and public policy from Harvard Kennedy School. Wollshalager lived in Cannon Falls, Goodhue County, Minnesota with her husband and family. She served on the Cannon Falls School Board from 1887 to 2005 and in the Minnesota House of Representatives in 2007 and 2008. Wollschlager was a Democrat.

References

1957 births
Living people
People from Austin, Minnesota
People from Goodhue County, Minnesota
American chemists
Augsburg University alumni
Harvard Kennedy School alumni
Women state legislators in Minnesota
School board members in Minnesota
Democratic Party members of the Minnesota House of Representatives